Udhreko Choli is a Nepali item song from the movie Loot. It was sung by Indira Joshi and Nischal Basnet and composed by Roshan Thapa. Basnet directed the movie. Sushma Karki is featured in the video of this song. "Udhreko Choli" had been popular among youth due to its crude lyrics. Though the song was modeled on Bollywood item songs, it is very Nepali because of its pure lyrics that were instrumental in making this song  is popular  all over Nepal.

References 

Nepalese film songs